Robert Van Lancker (born 11 December 1946) is a Belgian track cyclist who mostly competed in sprint and tandem events (together with Daniel Goens), in which he won eight medals at the world championships between 1967 and 1974. At the 1968 Summer Olympics he won a bronze medal in the tandem and failed to reach the final in the individual sprint. Next year he turned professional and competed until 1976.

References

1946 births
Living people
People from Grâce-Hollogne
Belgian male cyclists
Cyclists at the 1968 Summer Olympics
Olympic cyclists of Belgium
Olympic bronze medalists for Belgium
Olympic medalists in cycling
Medalists at the 1968 Summer Olympics
UCI Track Cycling World Champions (men)
Cyclists from Liège Province
Belgian track cyclists